Said Maulidi Kalukula (born 3 September 1984 in Namageni, Lugonya River) is a Tanzanian-Congolese football striker.

Career
Kalukula began 1995 his career with Simba SC and signed 2001 for League rival Young Africans FC. after 196 games and 50 goals for Yanga FC signed in January 2008 for Angolan club Futebol Clube Onze Bravos do Maquis.

Attributes
Kalukula is a player with pace and ball controlling ability, when playing, he is very threat to the opponents.

International career
He is a member of the Tanzania national football team.

Personal life
Kalukula immigrated 2002 to the Republic of the Congo and lost his nationality in 2004 he obtained the Tanzanian passport.

References

1984 births
Living people
Association football forwards
Tanzanian footballers
Young Africans S.C. players
F.C. Bravos do Maquis players
Tanzania international footballers
Tanzanian expatriate footballers
Expatriate footballers in Angola
Democratic Republic of the Congo expatriates in Angola
Tanzanian Premier League players